William Hill (born 6 January 1936), also known as Bill Hill, is an English former professional footballer who played as a winger in the Football League for York City and in non-League football for Rawmarsh Welfare, Scarborough and Matlock Town.

References

1936 births
Living people
Footballers from Sheffield
English footballers
Association football wingers
Rawmarsh Welfare F.C. players
York City F.C. players
Scarborough F.C. players
Matlock Town F.C. players
English Football League players